Jeferson Francisco dos Santos Barroso (born April 17, 1987 in São Paulo), known as Jeferson, is a Brazilian footballer who plays for São José as midfielder.

Career statistics

References

External links

1987 births
Living people
Brazilian footballers
Association football midfielders
São José Esporte Clube players
Grêmio Catanduvense de Futebol players
Clube Atlético Sorocaba players
América Futebol Clube (SP) players
São Bernardo Futebol Clube players
União Agrícola Barbarense Futebol Clube players
Associação Atlética Francana players
Footballers from São Paulo